Sangagiri block  is a revenue block of Salem district of the Indian state of Tamil Nadu. This revenue block consist of 22 panchayat villages. They are:

 Alathur
 Devannagoundanur
 Katheri
 Koneripatti
 Morur East
 Olakkachinnanur
 Sanyasipatti Agraharam
 Veerachipalayam
 Annathanapatti
 Irugalur
 Kaveripatti
 Koneripatti Agrm.
 Morur West
 Pullagoundampatti
 Sungudivaradhampatti
 Chinnagoundanur
 Iveli
 Kaveripatti Agraharam
 Kottavaradhampatti
 Mottaiyanur
 Pullagoundampatti Agrm.
 Vadugapatti

References 

Revenue blocks of Salem district